Stigmella splendidissimella is a moth of the family Nepticulidae. It is found from Scandinavia to Italy and from Ireland to the Crimea. It is not found in the Iberian Peninsula and the Balkan Peninsula.

The thick erect hairs on the head vertex are black. The collar is black. Antennal eyecaps are white. The forewings are dark coppery-purple-brown with a suffused brassy or green basal patch; a straight shining pale golden or shiny silver fascia beyond middle. Hindwings are grey. External image

The larvae feed on Agrimonia, Fragaria, Filipendula, Geum urbanum, Potentilla anserina, Rubus caesius, Rubus fruticosus and Rubus idaeus. They mine the leaves of their host plant.

References

External links
Fauna Europaea
Swedish moths
Stigmella splendidissimella images at  Consortium for the Barcode of Life
Bestimmungshilfe für die in Europa nachgewiesenen Schmetterlingsarten

Nepticulidae
Moths described in 1855
Moths of Europe